Borun-e Pain (also Romanized as Borūn-e Pā’īn; also known as Borūn) is a village in Lisar Rural District, Kargan Rud District, Talesh County, Gilan Province, Iran. At the 2006 census, its population was 34, in 5 families.

References 

Populated places in Talesh County